This is a list of mammals of Europe. It includes all mammals currently found in Europe (from northeast Atlantic to Ural Mountains and northern slope of Caucasus Mountains), whether resident or as regular migrants. Moreover, species occurring in Cyprus, Canary Islands (Spain) and Azores (Portugal) are listed here. If geographical range of given European mammal additionally overlaps Turkey, it is noted in some of cases. This checklist does not include species found only in captivity or extinct in Europe, except where there is some doubt about this. Each species is listed, with its binomial name and notes on its distribution where this is limited. Introduced species are also noted.

Summary of 2006 IUCN Red List categories.
Conservation status - IUCN Red List of Threatened Species:
 - extinct,  - extinct in the wild
 - critically endangered,  - endangered  - vulnerable
 - near threatened,  - least concern
 - data deficient,  - not evaluated
(v. 2013.2, the data is current as of March 5, 2014)

Eulipotyphlans

Erinaceidae
Hedgehogs
European hedgehog, Erinaceus europaeus 
Southern white-breasted hedgehog, Erinaceus concolor 
Northern white-breasted hedgehog, Erinaceus roumanicus 
Long-eared hedgehog, Hemiechinus auritus  (eastern Europe)

Talpidae
Moles
Aquitanian mole, Talpa aquitania (France, Spain)
Mediterranean mole, Talpa caeca  (south of the Alps)
Caucasian mole, Talpa caucasica (Caucasus, Russia) 
European mole, Talpa europaea 
Martino's mole, Talpa martinorum (Bulgaria)
Spanish mole, Talpa occidentalis  (Iberian Peninsula)
Roman mole, Talpa romana  (Italy and Greece)
Balkan mole, Talpa stankovici  (Balkans)
Desmans
Russian desman, Desmana moschata  (Russia, Ukraine)
Pyrenean desman, Galemys pyrenaicus  (Spain, Portugal, the Pyrenees)

Soricidae (shrews)
Common shrew, Sorex araneus 
Crowned shrew, Sorex coronatus 
Iberian shrew, Sorex granarius 
Apennine shrew, Sorex samniticus 
Eurasian pygmy shrew, Sorex minutus 
Laxmann's shrew, Sorex caecutiens 
Eurasian least shrew, Sorex minutissimus 
Taiga shrew, Sorex isodon 
Alpine shrew, Sorex alpinus 
Valais shrew, Sorex antinorii  (Italy, France, Switzerland) - formerly in Sorex araneus, and:
Udine shrew, Sorex arunchi   (Italy, Slovenia)
Radde's shrew, Sorex raddei  (Caucasus, Russia)
Caucasian shrew, Sorex satunini  (Caucasus, Russia)
Caucasian pygmy shrew, Sorex volnuchini  (Caucasus, Russia)
Eurasian water shrew, Neomys fodiens 
Iberian water shrew, Neomys anomalus  (Iberian Peninsula) and:
Mediterranean water shrew, Neomys milleri
Transcaucasian water shrew, Neomys teres  (Caucasus, Russia)
Etruscan shrew, Suncus etruscus 
Greater white-toothed shrew, Crocidura russula 
Lesser white-toothed shrew, Crocidura suaveolens 
Bicoloured shrew, Crocidura leucodon 
Gueldenstaedt's shrew, Crocidura gueldenstaedtii
Sicilian shrew, Crocidura sicula  (Sicily, Malta)
North African white-toothed shrew, Crocidura pachyura  (Mediterranean islands)
Cretan shrew, Crocidura zimmermanni  (Crete)
Canarian shrew, Crocidura canariensis  (Canary Islands in Africa - Spain)
Piebald shrew, Diplomesodon pulchellus  (Kazakhstan, Russia)

Primates

Barbary macaque, Macaca sylvanus  (Gibraltar, introduced)

Bats

Pteropodidae (megabat)
Egyptian fruit bat, Rousettus aegyptiacus  (Cyprus)

Rhinolophidae (horseshoe bats)
Lesser horseshoe bat, Rhinolophus hipposideros 
Greater horseshoe bat, Rhinolophus ferrumequinum 
Mediterranean horseshoe bat, Rhinolophus euryale 
Blasius's horseshoe bat, Rhinolophus blasii 
Mehely's horseshoe bat, Rhinolophus mehelyi

Vespertilionidae (evening bats)
Daubenton's bat, Myotis daubentonii 
Nathalina bat, Myotis (daubentonii) nathalinae
Long-fingered bat, Myotis capaccinii 
Pond bat, Myotis dasycneme 
Brandt's bat, Myotis brandtii 
Whiskered bat, Myotis mystacinus 
David’s myotis, Myotis davidii (south-eastern and eastern Europe), includes i.e.:
Steppe whiskered bat, Myotis aurascens  
Alcathoe bat, Myotis alcathoe  (Greece, Hungary)
Geoffroy's bat, Myotis emarginatus 
Natterer's bat, Myotis nattereri  and:
Cryptic myotis, Myotis crypticus
Tschuli myotis, Myotis tschuliensis (Eastern Europe)
Hovel's myotis, Myotis hoveli (Cyprus)
Escalera's bat, Myotis escalerai  (Spain, Portugal, France)
Bechstein's bat, Myotis bechsteinii 
Greater mouse-eared bat, Myotis myotis 
Lesser mouse-eared bat, Myotis blythii 
Felten's myotis, Myotis punicus  (Corsica, Sardinia, Malta)
Common noctule, Nyctalus noctula 
Lesser noctule, Nyctalus leisleri 
Azores noctule, Nyctalus azoreum  (the only mammal species endemic to North Atlantic Azores archipelago - Portugal)
Greater noctule, Nyctalus lasiopterus 
Anatolian serotine, Eptesicus anatolicus (east Aegean Islands in Greece, Cyprus) - split from Botta's serotine, Eptesicus bottae 
Serotine, Eptesicus serotinus  and:
Eptesicus lobatus   (Ukraine)
Meridional serotine, Eptesicus (serotinus) isabellinus 
Northern bat, Eptesicus nilssonii 
Parti-coloured bat, Vespertilio murinus 
Common pipistrelle, Pipistrellus pipistrellus 
Soprano pipistrelle, Pipistrellus pygmaeus 
Nathusius's pipistrelle, Pipistrellus nathusii 
Kuhl's pipistrelle, Pipistrellus kuhlii 
Savi's pipistrelle, Pipistrellus savii 
Crete pipistrelle, Pipistrellus creticus (Crete)
Dusky pipistrelle, Pipistrellus hesperidus  (Canary Islands in Africa - Spain)
Common long-eared bat, Plecotus auritus 
Grey long-eared bat, Plecotus austriacus 
Madeira pipistrelle, Pipistrellus maderensis  (Canary Islands and Madeira in Africa - Spain, Portugal)
Kolombatovic's long-eared bat, Plecotus kolombatovici  (Mediterranean)
Alpine long-eared bat, Plecotus macrobullaris  (mountains of southern Europe)
Sardinian long-eared bat, Plecotus sardus  (Sardinia)
Canary long-eared bat, Plecotus teneriffae  (Canary Islands in Africa - Spain) and:
Gaisler's long-eared bat, Plecotus gaisleri (Malta, Italy)
Barbastelle, Barbastella barbastellus 
Caspian barbastelle, Barbastella caspica (Caucasus)

Miniopteridae
Schreibers' bat, Miniopterus schreibersii  and:
Pallid long-fingered bat, Miniopterus pallidus  (Caucasus)

Molossidae (free-tailed bats)
European free-tailed bat, Tadarida teniotis  (southern Europe)

Nycteridae (slit-faced bats)
Egyptian slit-faced bat, Nycteris thebaica

Lagomorphs

Leporidae (leporids)
European rabbit, Oryctolagus cuniculus 
European hare, Lepus europaeus 
Mountain hare, Lepus timidus 
Granada hare, Lepus granatensis  (Spain, Portugal)
Broom hare, Lepus castroviejoi  (Cantabrian Mountains)
Corsican hare, Lepus corsicanus  (Corsica, southern Italy)
Cape hare, Lepus capensis  (Corsica, Cyprus in Asia - Greece, Turkey)
Tolai hare, Lepus tolai  (Kazakhstan)

Rodents

Sciuridae (squirrels)

Red squirrel, Sciurus vulgaris  and:
Calabrian black squirrel, Sciurus meridionalis (Italy)
Siberian flying squirrel, Pteromys volans  (northern Scandinavia, Estonia)
European souslik, Spermophilus citellus  (north-eastern Europe)
Yellow ground squirrel, Spermophilus fulvus  (eastern Europe)
Little ground squirrel, Spermophilus pygmaeus  (eastern Europe)
Caucasian squirrel, Sciurus anomalus  (eastern Europe)
Spotted souslik, Spermophilus suslicus  (south-eastern Europe)
Russet ground squirrel, Spermophilus major  (Russia, Kazakhstan)
Caucasian Mountain ground squirrel, Spermophilus musicus  (Caucasus)
Alpine marmot, Marmota marmota  (Alps, Tatras, Carpathians, Pyrenees and Balkans)
Bobak marmot, Marmota bobak  (eastern Europe)
Siberian chipmunk, Eutamias sibiricus  (Netherlands, Belgium and Germany)

Castoridae
European beaver, Castor fiber

Hystricidae (Old World porcupines)
Crested porcupine, Hystrix cristata  (Italy, introduced)
Indian porcupine, Hystrix indica  (European Azerbaijan and Georgia)

Gliridae (dormice)
Garden dormouse, Eliomys quercinus 
Forest dormouse, Dryomys nitedula  (eastern Europe)
Woolly dormouse, Dryomys laniger  (Turkey)
European edible dormouse, Glis glis 
Hazel dormouse, Muscardinus avellanarius 
Roach's mouse-tailed dormouse, Myomimus roachi  (Greece and Bulgaria)

Muroids: Spalacidae (spalacids)
Greater mole rat, Spalax microphthalmus  (eastern Europe)
Lesser mole rat, Spalax leucodon  (eastern Europe)
Podolsk mole rat, Spalax zemni  (eastern Europe)
Sandy mole-rat, Spalax arenarius  (eastern Europe)
Balkan mole rat, Spalax graecus  and:
Mehely's blind mole-rat, Spalax antiquus (Romania)
Oltenia blind mole-rat, Spalax istricus (Romania)
Nehring's blind mole rat, Spalax nehringi  (may occur in Greece)
Giant blind mole-rat, Spalax giganteus  (Russia)

Muroids: Cricetidae
Hamsters
Common hamster, Cricetus cricetus  (eastern Europe)
Gray dwarf hamster, Cricetulus migratorius  (Balkans)
Romanian hamster, Mesocricetus newtoni  (shores of the Black Sea)
Ciscaucasian hamster, Mesocricetus raddei  (Russia)
Brandt's hamster, Mesocricetus brandti  (Caucasus)
Eversmann's hamster, Allocricetulus eversmanni  (Russia, Kazakhstan)
Lemmings
Wood lemming, Myopus schisticolor  (Scandinavia)
Norway lemming, Lemmus lemmus  (northern Europe)
Siberian brown lemming, Lemmus sibiricus  (Russia)
Arctic lemming, Dicrostonyx torquatus  (Svalbard as migrant)
Voles
Bank vole, Myodes glareolus 
Northern red-backed vole, Myodes rutilus 
Grey red-backed vole, Myodes rufocanus 
Martino's Dinaric vole, Dinaromys bogdanovi  (Balkans) and:
Western Dinaric vole, Dinaromys longipedis (Balkans)
European water vole, Arvicola amphibius  and:
Italian water vole, Arvicola italicus (Italy, Switzerland)
Montane water vole, Arvicola monticola, A. scherman 
Southwestern water vole, Arvicola sapidus  (Spain and France)
Root vole, Alexandromys oeconomus 
Middendorff's vole, Alexandromys middendorffii  (Russia)
Short-tailed field vole, Microtus agrestis  and:
Mediterranean field vole, Microtus lavernedii
Portuguese field vole, Microtus rozianus (Iberian Peninsula)
Pyrenean pine vole, Microtus pyrenaicus (France, Spain)
Common vole, Microtus arvalis  and:
Altai vole, Microtus obscurus (eastern Europe)
Sibling vole, Microtus epiroticus
Snow vole, Microtus nivalis 
Gunther's vole, Microtus guentheri  and:
Harting's vole, Microtus hartingi (Balkans)
Cabrera's vole, Microtus cabrerae 
European pine vole, Microtus subterraneus 
East European gray vole, Microtus rossiaemeridionalis 
Social vole, Microtus socialis 
Felten's vole, Microtus felteni 
Gerbe's vole, Microtus gerbei 
Savi's pine vole, Microtus savii  and:
Sicilian pine vole, Microtus nebrodensis (Italy) 
Calabria pine vole, Microtus brachycercus (Italy) 
Alpine pine vole, Microtus multiplex 
Tatra pine vole, Microtus tatricus 
Liechtenstein's pine vole, Microtus liechtensteini  and:
Bavarian pine vole, Microtus bavaricus  
Mediterranean pine vole, Microtus duodecimcostatus 
Lusitanian pine vole, Microtus lusitanicus 
Thomas's pine vole, Microtus thomasi 
Major's pine vole, Microtus majori 
Caucasian pine vole, Microtus daghestanicus  (Caucasus)
Narrow-headed vole, Lasiopodomys gregalis  (Russia)
Gudaur snow vole, Chionomys gud  (Caucasus)
Robert's snow vole, Chionomys roberti  (Caucasus)
Steppe lemming, Lagurus lagurus 
Northern mole vole, Ellobius talpinus 
Long-clawed mole vole, Prometheomys schaposchnikowi  (Caucasus)

Muroids: Muridae
Old World rats and mice
Wood mouse, Apodemus sylvaticus 
Steppe field mouse, Apodemus witherbyi  (eastern Europe)
Yellow-necked mouse, Apodemus flavicollis  and:
Black Sea field mouse, Apodemus ponticus  (Caucasus)
Alpine field mouse, Apodemus alpicola  (Alps)
Pygmy field mouse, Apodemus uralensis  (eastern Europe)
Broad-toothed field mouse, Apodemus mystacinus  (south-eastern Europe)
Western broad-toothed field mouse, Apodemus epimelas  (Balkans)
Striped field mouse, Apodemus agrarius  (eastern Europe)
Eurasian harvest mouse, Micromys minutus 
House mouse, Mus musculus 
Algerian mouse, Mus spretus  (France, Spain and Portugal)
Steppe mouse, Mus spicilegus  (south-eastern Europe)
Cypriot mouse, Mus cypriacus  (Cyprus)
Macedonian mouse, Mus macedonicus  (south Balcans)
Spiny mice
Cretan spiny mouse, Acomys minous  (Crete)
Jirds
Tristram's jird, Meriones tristrami  (Greek island of Kos)
Tamarisk jird, Meriones tamariscinus  (eastern Europe)
Midday jird, Meriones meridianus  (eastern Europe)
Gerbils
Great gerbil, Rhombomys opimus  (Kazakhstan)

Muroids: Sminthidae (birch mice)
Northern birch mouse, Sicista betulina  (Scandinavia and north-eastern Europe)
Southern birch mouse, Sicista subtilis  (south-eastern Europe) and:
Hungarian birch mouse, Sicista (subtilis) trizona  (Hungary)
Nordmann’s birch mouse, Sicista loriger  (eastern Europe)
Strand's birch mouse, Sicista strandi  (eastern Europe)
Severtzov's birch mouse, Sicista severtzovi  (eastern Europe)
Caucasian birch mouse, Sicista caucasica  (Caucasus)
Kazbeg birch mouse, Sicista kazbegica  (Caucasus)
Kluchor birch mouse, Sicista kluchorica  (Caucasus)

Muroids: Dipodidae (jerboas)
Dwarf fat-tailed jerboa, Pygeretmus pumilio  (eastern Europe)
Great jerboa, Allactaga major  (eastern Europe)
Small five-toed jerboa, Allactaga elater  (eastern Europe)
Northern three-toed jerboa, Dipus sagitta  (eastern Europe)
Thick-tailed three-toed jerboa, Stylodipus telum  (eastern Europe)
Williams's jerboa, Scarturus williamsi  (Azerbaijan)

Carnivorans

Ursidae (bears)
Brown bear, Ursus arctos 
Polar bear, Ursus maritimus  (Svalbard, Arctic European Russia; migrant to Iceland)

Canidae

Golden jackal, Canis aureus  (Russia and south-eastern Europe)
Grey wolf, Canis lupus  (Spain, Italy, France, Germany, Scandinavia and eastern Europe)
Corsac fox, Vulpes corsac  (Along southern Volga and European Kazakhstan)
Arctic fox, Vulpes lagopus  (Scandinavia and Iceland)
Red fox, Vulpes vulpes

Mustelidae (weasels and allies)
Wolverine, Gulo gulo  (Scandinavia)
European otter, Lutra lutra 
Beech marten, Martes foina  (southern Europe)
European pine marten, Martes martes 
Sable, Martes zibellina  (western Ural Mountains, European Russia)
Caucasian badger, Meles canescens (Crete, Rhodes)
Asian badger, Meles leucurus  (Russia, Kazakhstan)
European badger, Meles meles 
Stoat, Mustela erminea 
Steppe polecat, Mustela eversmanii 
European mink, Mustela lutreola  (eastern Europe)
European polecat, Mustela putorius 
Least weasel, Mustela nivalis 
Siberian weasel, Mustela sibirica  (Russia)
Marbled polecat, Vormela peregusna  (southeastern Europe)

Viverridae (viverrids)
Common genet, Genetta genetta  (France, Spain, Italy, Portugal)

Felidae (cats)

Swamp cat, Felis chaus  (Cis-Caspian region)
African wildcat, Felis lybica  (France, Italy, Greece)
European wildcat, Felis silvestris 
Pallas's cat, Otocolobus manul  (eastern Caucasus, possibly extirpated)
Eurasian lynx, Lynx lynx 
Iberian lynx, Lynx pardinus  (Spain and Portugal)
Persian leopard, Panthera pardus tulliana  (Dagestan, Northern Caucasus, European Russia)

Hyaenidae (hyenas)
Striped hyena, Hyaena hyaena  (eastern Caucasus)

Phocidae (earless seals)
Hooded seal, Cystophora cristata  (Northern Scandinavia)
Bearded seal, Erignathus barbatus  (Northern Scandinavia)
Grey seal, Halichoerus grypus  (Norway, Baltics, Great Britain and Ireland)
Mediterranean monk seal, Monachus monachus  (Mediterranean)
Harp seal, Pagophilus groenlandicus  (Northern Scandinavia)
Common seal, Phoca vitulina 
Ringed seal, Pusa hispida  (Northern Scandinavia)

Odobenidae
Walrus, Odobenus rosmarus  (Svalbard, Iceland and as migrant further south)

Odd-toed ungulates

Equidae (horse)
Przewalski's horse, Equus ferus przewalskii  (E. ferus ) (Ukraine, Belarus)
Turkmenian kulan, Equus hemionus kulan  (E. hemionus ) (Ukraine)

Even-toed ungulates

Suidae (pigs)
Wild boar, Sus scrofa

Bovidae (bovid)
European bison, Bison bonasus  (reintroduced)
Wild goat, Capra aegagrus  (Caucasus)
West Caucasian tur, Capra caucasica  (Caucasus)
East Caucasian tur, Capra cylindricornis  (Caucasus)
Alpine ibex, Capra ibex  (France, Italy, Switzerland, and Germany)
Iberian ibex, Capra pyrenaica  (Spain and Portugal)
Goitered gazelle, Gazella subgutturosa  (European Azerbaijan)
Muskox, Ovibos moschatus  (Norway, Russia; reintroduced)
Mouflon, Ovis gmelini  (Cyprus)
Pyrenean chamois, Rupicapra pyrenaica 
Chamois, Rupicapra rupicapra 
Saiga antelope, Saiga tatarica  (European Russia and Kazakhstan)

Cervidae (deer)
Elk, Alces alces 
Roe deer, Capreolus capreolus 
Red deer, Cervus elaphus 
Fallow deer, Dama dama 
Reindeer, Rangifer tarandus  (Scandinavia)

Cetacea

Delphinidae (oceanic dolphins)

White-beaked dolphin, Lagenorhynchus albirostris 
Atlantic white-sided dolphin, Lagenorhynchus acutus 
Rough-toothed dolphin, Steno bredanensis 
Striped dolphin, Stenella coeruleoalba 
Atlantic spotted dolphin, Stenella frontalis 
Short-beaked common dolphin, Delphinus delphis (Mediterranean subpopulation: ,)
Bottle-nosed dolphin, Tursiops truncatus (Mediterranean subpopulation: ,)
Fraser's dolphin, Lagenodelphis hosei  (Canary Islands in Africa)
False killer whale, Pseudorca crassidens 
Killer whale, Orcinus orca 
Risso's dolphin, Grampus griseus 
Long-finned pilot whale, Globicephala melas 
Short-finned pilot whale, Globicephala macrorhynchus 
Pygmy killer whale, Feresa attenuata

Phocoenidae (porpoises)
Common porpoise, Phocoena phocoena  (Baltic Sea subpopulation: , ssp. relicta - Black Sea harbour porpoise)

Monodontidae
White whale, Delphinapterus leucas  (Arctic Ocean)
Narwhal, Monodon monoceros  (Arctic Ocean)

Kogiidae
Pygmy sperm whale, Kogia breviceps 
Dwarf sperm whale, Kogia sima

Physeteridae
Sperm whale, Physeter macrocephalus 

Ziphiidae (beaked whales)
Gervais' beaked whale, Mesoplodon europaeus 
Blainville's beaked whale, Mesoplodon densirostris 
True's beaked whale, Mesoplodon mirus 
Sowerby's beaked whale, Mesoplodon bidens 
Grays beaked whale, Mesoplodon grayi 
Northern bottlenose whale, Hyperoodon ampullatus 
Cuvier's beaked whale, Ziphius cavirostris 

Balaenopteridae (rorquals)

Blue whale, Balaenoptera musculus  (ssp. musculus North Atlantic stock)
Fin whale, Balaenoptera physalus 
Sei whale, Balaenoptera borealis 
Common minke whale, Balaenoptera acutorostrata 
Bryde's whale, Balaenoptera edeni  (Canary Islands in Africa)
Humpback whale, Megaptera novaeangliae

Eschrichtiidae
 Gray whale, Eschrichtius robustus CR (possible vagrant from Pacific was recorded in 2010)

Balaenidae
Bowhead whale, Balaena mysticetus (Svalbard-Barents Sea (Spitsbergen) subpopulation)
North Atlantic right whale, Eubalaena glacialis

Introduced animals

Macropodidae (macropods)
Red-necked wallaby, Notamacropus rufogriseus  (Britain, Ireland, France and Germany, introduced)

Erinaceidae
North African hedgehog, Atelerix algirus  (France and Spain, probably introduced)

Sciuridae (squirrels)
Grey squirrel, Sciurus carolinensis  (Britain, introduced)
Barbary ground squirrel, Atlantoxerus getulus  (Canary Islands in Africa - Spain, introduced)
Siberian chipmunk, Tamias sibiricus  (introduced)

Myocastoridae
Coypu, Myocastor coypus  (introduced)

Cricetidae
Muskrat
Muskrat, Ondatra zibethicus  (introduced)

Muroids: Muridae
Old World rats and mice
Brown rat, Rattus norvegicus  (introduced)
Black rat, Rattus rattus  (introduced)

Canidae
Raccoon dog, Nyctereutes procyonoides  (introduced)

Mustelidae (weasel)
American mink, Neogale vison  (much of Europe)
Asian small-clawed otter, Aonyx cinereus  (Great Britain, introduced)

Herpestidae (mongooses)
Egyptian mongoose, Herpestes ichneumon  (Spain and Portugal, disputed, possibly native)

Procyonidae
South American coati, Nasua nasua  (Great Britain, introduced)
Common raccoon, Procyon lotor  (introduced)

Mephitidae
Striped skunk, Mephitis mephitis  (introduced)

Bovidae (bovid)
Barbary sheep, Ammotragus lervia  (Spain and Portugal, introduced)

Cervidae (deer)
Chital, Axis axis  (introduced)
Wapiti, Cervus canadensis  (Italy, introduced)
Sika deer, Cervus nippon  (introduced)
Chinese water deer, Hydropotes inermis  (Britain, France, introduced)
Chinese muntjac, Muntiacus reevesi  (Britain, Ireland, Japan, the Netherlands, Belgium, introduced)
White-tailed deer, Odocoileus virginianus  (introduced)

See also
List of amphibians of Europe
List of birds of Europe
List of reptiles of Europe
List of mammal genera
Lists of mammals by region
List of extinct animals of Europe

Further reading
Macdonald D., Barrett P., Collins Field Guide: Mammals of Britain & Europe, HarperCollinsPublishers, London, 1993, 
Görner M., Hackethal H., Beobachten und bestimmen: Säugetiere Europas, Neumann Verlag, Leipzig, Radebeul, 1987,

Notes

References

External links
Mammal Species of the World, 3rd edition (MSW3) - database of mammalian taxonomy
Databases: Division of Mammals: Department of Vertebrate Zoology: NMNH

 
Mammals
Europe